The Funeral Sermon and Prayer is the oldest known and surviving contiguous Hungarian text, written by one scribal hand in the Latin script and dating to 1192–1195. It is found on f.154a of the Codex Pray.

Importance 

The importance of the Funeral Sermon resides from being the oldest surviving Hungarian and as such also the oldest Uralic, text — although individual words and even short partial sentences appear in charters, such as the founding charter of the Veszprém valley nunnery (997–1018/1109) or the founding charter of the abbey of Tihany (1055).

Structure 

The whole monument has two parts: the sermon's text (26 lines and 227 words) and the prayer (6 lines and 47 words). Not counting repeated words, there are 190 individual terms in the text. The work was written after a Latin version, which has been identified and can be found in the very codex. However, the Funeral Sermon and Prayer is a new composition based on it, rather than a mere translation. Since 1813, the manuscript has been kept in Budapest, Hungary, and is currently in the National Széchényi Library.

Text

Note on transcription 

The text in the original manuscript is written in Carolingian minuscule. This script uses ſ as the sole form for s, even at the end of words. Likewise, for z the historical ʒ form is used by the scribe. In this transcription we follow Hungarian editing tradition, where the ſ is retained, but ʒ is replaced by its modern equivalent.

Diacritics on vowels and y (dots, acutes) have been omitted.

The funeral sermon

The prayer

Sources 

 Gábor: Régi magyar nyelvemlékek (I.). Buda, 1838
 Zolnai, Gyula: Nyelvemlékeink a könyvnyomtatás koráig. Budapest 1984 
 Benkõ, Loránd: Az Árpád-kor magyar nyelvű szövegemlékei. Budapest, 1980.

External links 
English translation by Alan Jenkins (Babel Web Anthology; original source: Hundred Hungarian Poems, Albion Editions, Manchester, 1976.)
Another English translation of the Funeral Sermon and Prayer
A high-quality photographic reproduction at the Hungarian National Széchényi Library
Old Hungarian Corpus – searchable text of the Funeral Sermon and Prayer in its original orthographic form as well as its version normalized to Modern Hungarian spelling

Hungarian language
Hungarian literature
1190s books
Earliest known manuscripts by language
Funeral orations
Catholic liturgy
Christian sermons
Medieval documents of Hungary